Katri Vala (1901–1944) was a Finnish poet, critic, school teacher, and central member of the literary group Tulenkantajat (The Fire Bearers) with Olavi Paavolainen, Elina Vaara, Lauri Viljanen, Ilmari Pimiä, Viljo Kajava, and Yrjö Jylhä.

Biography
She was born in 1901 in Muonio, and died of tuberculosis in 1944 in the Hessleby sanatorium at Mariannelund in Sweden.

References

External links
 
 Saarenheimo, Kerttu: Vala, Katri (1901 - 1944) Kansallisbiografia-verkkojulkaisu. Helsinki: Suomalaisen Kirjallisuuden Seura. 

1901 births
1944 deaths
People from Muonio
People from Oulu Province (Grand Duchy of Finland)
20th-century Finnish poets
Writers from Lapland (Finland)
Finnish women poets
20th-century women writers